Cashel is a former British Parliament constituency in Ireland, returning one MP. It was an original constituency represented in Parliament when the Union of Great Britain and Ireland took effect on 1 January 1801.

There were problems with the 21 November 1868 election in the borough. A petition was presented by the losing candidate, alleging corruption. As a result, the election was declared void. Parliament then passed the Sligo and Cashel Disfranchisement Act 1870. On 1 August 1870 Cashel lost the right to elect its own MP. The area was transferred to form part of the County Tipperary constituency.

History
The corporation of the city of Cashel existed, as the local government of its area, until it was abolished by the Municipal Corporations (Ireland) Act 1840. The parliamentary borough was not affected by this change in administrative arrangements.

Samuel Lewis, writing in 1837, described the oligarchic constitution of the city.

Boundaries
This constituency was the parliamentary borough of Cashel in County Tipperary.

The parliamentary boundaries of the cities and boroughs in Ireland were defined by the Parliamentary Boundaries (Ireland) Act 1832 as:

Members of Parliament

Elections

Elections in the 1830s

Pennefather resigned, causing a by-election.

Perrin was appointed as Attorney-General for Ireland, causing a by-election.

Perrin was appointed as a Puisne justice of the King's Bench, causing a by-election.

Woulfe was appointed as Solicitor-General for Ireland, requiring a by-election.

Woulfe was appointed as Lord Chief Baron of the Court of Exchequer in Ireland, causing a by-election.

Elections in the 1840s

Stock resigned by accepting the office of Steward of the Chiltern Hundreds, causing a by-election.

Elections in the 1850s

Elections in the 1860s

On petition, this election was declared void on account of bribery and the seat was disenfranchised. The seat was absorbed into Tipperary in 1870.

Notes

References

The Parliaments of England by Henry Stooks Smith (1st edition published in three volumes 1844–50), 2nd edition edited (in one volume) by F.W.S. Craig (Political Reference Publications 1973)

British Electoral Facts 1832–1987, compiled and edited by F.W.S. Craig (Parliamentary Research Services, 5th edition, 1989)

External links
Part of the Library Ireland: Irish History and Culture website containing the text of A Topographical Directory of Ireland, by Samuel Lewis (a work published by S. Lewis & Co of London in 1837) including an article on Cashel

Westminster constituencies in County Tipperary (historic)
Constituencies of the Parliament of the United Kingdom established in 1801
Constituencies of the Parliament of the United Kingdom disestablished in 1870
Parliamentary constituencies disenfranchised for corruption
Cashel, County Tipperary